Silas Kenneth Johnson (October 5, 1906 – May 12, 1994) was an American professional baseball player, a right-handed pitcher who appeared in 492 Major League games pitched over 17 seasons for the Cincinnati Reds (1928–36), St. Louis Cardinals (1936–38), Philadelphia Phillies (1940–43; 1946) and Boston Braves (1946–47).

Johnson led the National League in losses in 1931 (19) and 1934 (22). He also led the National League in earned runs allowed (125) in 1934.

Missing the 1944–45 baseball seasons, Johnson served with the US Navy during World War II.

In 17 seasons Johnson had a 101–165 win–loss record, 492 games, 272 games started, 108 complete games, 13 shutouts, 115 games finished, 15 saves, 2,281 innings pitched, 2,510 hits allowed, 1,226 runs allowed, 1,036 earned runs allowed, 120 home runs allowed, 687 walks allowed, 840 strikeouts, 36 hit batsmen, 26 wild pitches, 9,903 batters faced, 3 balks and a 4.09 ERA.

Johnson remained in baseball for two seasons after his active career ended, serving as batting practice pitcher and then pitching coach of the Braves (1948–49); he was a member of Boston's 1948 National League champions. He died in Sheridan, Illinois at the age of 87.

References

External links

1906 births
1987 deaths
American people of Norwegian descent
Baseball players from Illinois
Boston Braves coaches
Boston Braves players
Cincinnati Reds players
Columbus Senators players
Major League Baseball pitchers
Major League Baseball pitching coaches
People from LaSalle County, Illinois
Philadelphia Phillies players
Rochester Red Wings players
Rock Island Islanders players
St. Louis Cardinals players
Toronto Maple Leafs (International League) players